Stator is a genus of seed beetles in the family Chrysomelidae. There are about 14 described species in Stator. Most members of the genus specialize on legumes.

Species
These 14 species belong to the genus Stator:

 Stator beali Johnson, 1963 i c g b
 Stator bixae (Drapiez, 1820) g
 Stator bottimeri Kingsolver, 1972 i c g
 Stator chihuahua Johnson & Kingsolver, 1976 i c g b
 Stator coconino Johnson and Kingsolver, 1976 i c g
 Stator dissimilis
 Stator huautlae Romero-Napoles & Johnson, 2004 g
 Stator limbatus (Horn, 1873) i c g b
 Stator monachus (Sharp, 1885) g
 Stator pruininus (Horn, 1873) i c g b (pruinose bean weevil)
 Stator pygidialis (Schaeffer, 1907) i c g
 Stator sordidus (Horn, 1873) i c g b
 Stator subaeneus (Schaeffer, 1907) i c g b
 Stator vachelliae Bottimer, 1973 i c g b

Data sources: i = ITIS, c = Catalogue of Life, g = GBIF, b = Bugguide.net

References

Bruchinae
Chrysomelidae genera